Tumyr or tyumyr (тюмыр) are a type of Mari two-sided drums. The Mari shyuvr (bagpipe) is almost always played with the tumyr.

References

Mari musical instruments
Drums